The Bilbao metro is a rapid transit system serving the city of Bilbao and the region of Greater Bilbao. Lines 1 and 2 have a "Y" shape, as they transit both banks of the river Ibaizabal and then combine to form one line that ends in the south of Bilbao. Line 3 has a "V" shape connecting the municipality of Etxebarri with the Bilbao neighbourhood of Matiko; the apex of the "V" is Zazpikaleak/Casco Viejo station, where all three current lines meet. The metro is connected with the Bilbao tram, Bilboko Aldiriak (commuter rail services), Euskotren Trena (commuter rail services), Feve (commuter rail services, regional and long-distance trains), Renfe long-distance trains and Bilbao's bus station (Bilbao Intermodal). All three lines use metre gauge.

It is the third-busiest metro in Spain, after the Madrid and Barcelona metro systems.

The system was inaugurated in 1995, partially taking over a suburban railway line operated by Euskotren, first opened in 1887. A second line was added in 2002, running together with line 1 within Bilbao, and then serving towns along the left bank of the Ibaizabal-Nervion estuary. Line 3, operated by Euskotren, opened in 2017. Unlike the first two lines, which form an isolated system, line 3 is operated jointly with the Euskotren Trena commuter railway network.

Lines and stations

Lines

Stations 

The main station of the network is Zazpikaleak/Casco Viejo, the only one in which all three lines meet. Since line 3 is operated as part of the wider Euskotren Trena network, the station is also the main hub for Euskotren's commuter railway services in Bilbao. Other important interchange stations are Abando (connections to Cercanías and Feve commuter railway lines and Renfe's long distance services) and Santimami/San Mamés (connections to Cercanías and the main bus terminal). Urbinaga station on line 2 was built as a future interchange station with two Cercanías commuter rail lines. However, the commuter rail station is not yet built, having been postponed several times.

Additionally, the Bilbao tram has stops near the Santimami/San Mamés, Abando and Zazpikaleak/Casco Viejo stations. Besides this, most stations have several bus connections.

Network map

History

Background and early proposals 

The first proposal for building a metro system in Bilbao was made in the 1920s. The network was planned to have two lines connecting Atxuri station with the westernmost parts of the city (at the time), each running via a different route. Banco Español de Crédito, which was to have backed the project financially, withdrew in 1925; rendering the project infeasible. The proposal for a metro system was definitively abandoned after the civil war.

In 1971 the government of Biscay, the Bilbao City Council and the Commerce Bureau created a commission to evaluate the transportation needs of Greater Bilbao. In 1974, the Spanish government pledged to give financial support to a metro project.

In 1976, the Biscay Transport Consortium was created. Two years later, in 1977, three proposals were made to build a metro line by 1985. Of these proposals, the first one was almost identical to the current network. The project for the construction of a metro was approved in 1977. However, many objections were raised against it, which together with disagreements between different institutions put the project on hold.

In 1983 the Basque Government approved a plan for transportation on the right bank of the Estuary of Bilbao, but its execution was delayed. The document was rewritten in 1985, and in 1987 the plan to build and fund the metro was approved.

Construction 

A metro system was deemed to be the best way to improve congestion problems in the evolving and regenerating city. The design for the underground stations was awarded to the architects Sir Norman Foster and partners in 1988 following an open competition.

The construction of the first line involved converting to rapid transit standards Euskotren's existing suburban railway line between San Inazio and Plentzia. The first works started in late 1988, with the existing Erandio station being put underground. In the city itself, a new tunnel was built between San Inazio and Casco Viejo. The central Moyúa square was closed to pedestrians from 1990 to 1997 due to construction activity. The works were especially complicated in the neighborhoods of Deusto and San Inazio, where the cut and cover tunnel excavation slightly damaged some buildings, was very noisy, and caused severe traffic disruptions. This method of excavation contrasted with the tunnel-boring machines used elsewhere in the city.

Line 1 
The first stretch of line 1 was opened on 11 November 1995, with 23 stations between Casco Viejo and Plentzia. The tracks outside Bilbao were previously part of Euskotren's Bilbao-Plentzia line, with parts of the alignment dating from 1887.

By 5 July 1997 the total number of stations was 27 as Santutxu, Basarrate and Bolueta joined Gobela which had opened the previous year.

Line 2 

The first line, which operates north of the River Nervión, was later joined by a second line, which operates south of the river. The two lines split at San Inazio, from where the second runs to Santurtzi. The original five stations (Gurutzeta-Cruces, Ansio, Barakaldo, Bagatza and Urbinaga) were opened on 13 April 2002. The furthest eastern point is now Etxebarri station, opened along with Sestao on 8 January 2005. Line 2 was enlarged with two new stations in Portugalete that were opened on 20 January 2007 (Abatxolo and Portugalete). Two new stations joined the Metro system on 4 July 2009 in Santurtzi: Peñota and Santurtzi stations. In 2014, the station of Kabiezes was inaugurated.

Line 3 

Following the commencement of works in the middle of 2009, it was inaugurated on 8 April 2017. It cost 279 million euros, significantly more than the original 153 million euro budget. and was expected to transport 71,000 people according to Bilbao council. The third line has a length of 5,885 metres and has one station in Etxebarri: Kukullaga-Etxebarri, and six stations in Bilbao: Otxarkoaga, Txurdinaga, Zurbaranbarri, Zazpikaleak/Casco Viejo, Uribarri and Matiko.

Future

Extensions to Line 1 
A new station in the municipality of Getxo called "Ibarbengoa-Getxo" was expected to be open in 2010, but was delayed until early 2012, and then to 2015. It is also expected that the level crossings located in Maidagan and Urduliz will be buried.

Extensions to Line 2 
It is not expected to expand the line further from Kabiezes, despite the requests of the neighbors of the Mining Zone and Ortuella, where the parking area of the Metro units will be located.

Extensions to common line (Lines 1 and 2) 
Basauri's town hall, along with the neighbouring towns, requested the construction of another station in Basauri, in the neighborhood of Sarratu. That station would work as an interchange station for different means of transportation. In the last months of 2009, Metro Bilbao announced that it would consider the creation of that station in Basauri, as it would work as an intermodal station for the services of Euskotren Trena; FEVE (which only has cargo services in that location); and even with Line 5 of the metro.

Line 3 expansion 

In a second phase, the third line will be expanded to Bilbao Airport, using a tunnel of double rail and with a length of 1,875 metres under Mount Artxanda.

Line 4 project (Under study) 
The preliminary layout of the future Line 4 (Moyúa/Rekalde) was presented on 25 January 2008. The preliminary layout suggests that Moyúa Station, which gives service to Line 1 and Line 2, will connect with Rekalde with two intermediate stations: Zabalburu (which has a suburban rail station) and Irala. There have been discussions about the ramifications of whether to connect with either Moyúa Station or Bilbao Abando Station, this is due to the fact that Rekalde did not have a Metro connection. Line 3 was planned to connect Rekalde with the rest of the city, but the final plan moved the line in another direction.

The plan to add Rekalde to Line 3 was halted, and the route completely altered. This change was criticised, especially by people from Rekalde. In 2009 a new layout for a new line (Line 4) was considered; this new line would connect Rekalde with Moyúa and the latter station with Deusto, taking advantage of the rail tracks of Euskotren Trena, that are in that zone. Matiko Station would be connected too. The line would then have the Plaza Euskadi Station ("Euskadi Square Station") after Moyúa and then cross the river to Deusto (Deusto Station) and a new station in the University of Deusto campus (Unibersitatea), to then reach Matiko (Line 3).

Line 5 project (Under study) 
Also on 25 January 2008 the preliminary layout for Line 5 (Etxebarri/Usansolo) was presented. This new line would connect Etxebarri with Galdakao. At first it was only planned for the line to have five stations, however the line is still on studies and may suffer major modifications. Later, one more station was added, on the Bengoetxe neighbourhood on Galdakao. The line was expected to begin constructed in 2012 and was expected to be finished in 2016.

The stations on the preliminary layout are Etxebarri (which gives service to Line 2 and Line 1), Aperribai, Bengoetxe, Galdakao, Galdakao's Hospital, and Usansolo, where the metro will be connected with lines 1, 1d and 3 from Euskotren Trena, which operate in that station.

Once the line is finished, there are plans for the line to become an extension of Line 2 from Etxebarri Station, while Line 1 would reach the center of Basauri.

Operation

Zones 

The Metro Bilbao network is divided into the following fare zones:

 Zone 1  (Bilbao), from Bolueta (main line for L1 and L2) to San Inazio (main line for L1 and L2), inclusive.
 Zone 2  (Upper Nervion), Etxebarri and Ariz (main line for L1 and L2).
 Zone 2A  (Right Bank of the river), from Lutxana (Line 1) to Berango (Line 1), inclusive.
 Zone 2B  (Left Bank of the river), from Gurutzeta/Cruces (Line 2) to Kabiezes (Line 2), inclusive.
 Zone 3  (Uribe Kosta), from Larrabasterra (Line 1) to Plentzia (Line 1), inclusive.

Cards (retired) 
Metro Bilbao offered special cards that are personal and cannot be transferred, replaced by Barik cards on 2017, with a time limit of 5 years since the date of issue. They can be obtained at any of the customer service offices of Metro Bilbao (located in the stations of Ansio, Casco Viejo, San Inazio and Areeta).

Carnet Kidea Socio (Kidea Member Card): For use with monthly tickets and Super 50 tickets.
Carnet Gaztea Joven (Youth Gaztea Card): For use with the youth ticket, monthly ticket and Super 50 tickets.
Carnet Hirukotrans (Hirukotrans Card): For use with the Hirukotrans ticket.
Carnet Gizatrans (Gizatrans Card): For use with Gizatrans ticket.
Carnet Gizatrans para familia numerosa (Gizatrans card for large families): For use with Gizatrans ticket for large families.

Tickets and fares 

The ticket system is closed, which means that validation of the ticket is required when entering the station and again when exiting.

There are different types of tickets, each of which has a different fare (updated as 2009):

Metro Bilbao exclusive use 
Occasional ticket: One-way ticket. Can be transferred. Fares: 1 Zone: 1,40€; 2 Zones: 1,50€; 3 Zones: 1,60€
Round-trip ticket: Valid for two trips (going and coming back). Can be transferred. Fares: 1 Zone: 2,80€; 2 Zones: 3€; 3 Zones: 3,20€
Billete Día (Day Ticket): Unlimited trips the same day of the expedition of the ticket. Can be transferred. Fare: 4€ (valid in all zones).
Billete colectivo (Groupal ticket): Valid for one trip or round trip, to be made on a specific date. Only for groups of 20 people or more. Fare: Variable.

Retired 
On 2017  the following tikets was replaced by the Barik cards:
Billete Mensual (Month Ticket): Unlimited trips in 30 days. Personal and cannot be transferred. A "Carnet Joven" (Youth Card), "Carnet de Socio del Metro" (Metro Honorary Member Card) or "Carnet Plus" (Plus Card) is required to obtain this ticket. Fare: 1 Zone: 29,40€; 2 Zones: 35€; 3 Zones: 40,70€
Ticket Joven (Youth Ticket): Unlimited trips in 12 months. Personal and cannot be transferred. To obtain one is needed to have less than 26 years and a Youth Card. Fares: 1 Zone: 188€; 2 Zones: 221€; 3 Zones: 255€
Super 50: Valid for 50 trips, to be made in 30 days. Personal cand cannot be transferred. A "Carnet Joven" (Youth Card), "Carnet de Socio del Metro" (Metro Honorary Member Card) or "Carnet Plus" (Plus Card) is required to obtain this ticket. Fares: 1 Zone: 24,50€; 2 Zones: 29€; 3 Zones: 32,50€

Combined tickets 
Combined ticket with Renfe (Uria): Valid for 10 trips. Can be transferred. Can be obtained in Abando Station and San Mames Station. The Uria ticket can be used in the following stations: Metro Bilbao: Zone A. Cercanías: Bilbao-Abando, Zabalburu Station, Ametzola Station, Autonomía Station, San Mamés Station, Olabeaga Station, Zorrotza Station, Miribilla Station and La Peña Station. The change between Renfe and Metro should be of 20 minutes or less. Fare: 9,65€.
Combined ticket with Euskotren Trena. Valid for 10 trips, monthly or annual. Valid in the stations of Casco Viejo and Bolueta. The change between Euskotren Trena and Metro should be of 15 minutes or less.

Barik cards 

Creditrans. Valid for as many trips as the money charge (pre-paid) of the card supports. Can be transferred and used several times in the same trip. Creditrans is a pre-paid card that can be used in Metro Bilbao, Euskotren Trena, the tram, FEVE, Bilbobus, Bizkaibus, Artxanda Funicular, Vizcaya Bridge, Lujua's Bus, Etxebarri Bus and Sopelbus. Fares: 1 Zone: 0,69€; 2 Zones: 0,83€; 3 Zones: 0,93€. Creditrans is the most popular and most used ticket system on Metro Bilbao and some other transportation systems.
Gizatrans (only valid for people older than 65 or some kind of physical disadvantage). Personal and cannot be transferred. It can be used in the same places as Creditrans with the exceptions of Sopelbus, FEVE and Vizcaya Bridge. Price (of a single Gizatrans card): 3€. Fares (for Metro Bilbao): 0,27€ (valid in all zones).
Hirukotrans (big families). Personal and cannot be transferred. To obtain one is needed to have a Hirukotrans Card. Only available for big families.

Creditrans, Gizatrans and Hirukotrans will no longer be issued after 31 March 2013 as they have been replaced by the Barik electronic card. Any old Creditrans with a credit on them can be used until the end of 2013.

Schedules and frequencies 
The Metro network works from 6:00 am until 11:00 pm from Monday to Thursday, and until 2:00 am on Friday and days before festive days. There is an all night service from Saturday to Sunday, with trains each 15 minutes on the main lines and with a 30-minute frequency on the other lines. During June, July, August and September, the no-interruptions night service also works on Fridays. During "Bilbao's Great Week", there are special services every night.

During weekdays, there is a frequency of 2.5 minutes on Zone A, 5 minutes on Zone B.0, B.1 y B.2 and 18 minutes on Zone C during most of the day.

Ridership 
In 2007 Metro Bilbao was used by almost 86 million people, being the third most used metro in Spain after Madrid and Barcelona. Since it serves directly about 680,000 people, each citizen travels about 126 times a year. Ridership increases steadily every year, there were dramatic increases in 1998 and 2002 due to enlargement of the network, ridership is expected to reach 100 million people per year once the network is completed.

Busiest stations in 2019

 Casco Viejo – 7,211,370
 Moyua – 6,401,254
 Indautxu – 6,279,735
 San Mames – 6,215,224
 Abando – 6,202,976
 Santutxu – 4,452,957
 Deustu – 4,171,359
 Barakaldo – 3,580,409
 Gurutzeta/Cruces – 3,519,419
 Areeta – 3,445,833

Design 
 
Access to the metro is provided by 'fosteritos', glass structures affectionately named after the architect who designed them, Norman Foster. These modern-looking tunnels stand attractive alongside the modern and innovative interior of the stations.

Large caverns of a 160m2 cross section were dug for stations, creating large open spaces, as opposed to the traditional sets of linked tunnels. For example, the ticket line is in the same space as the trains, for this purpose steel structures called 'mezzanines' have been built over the tracks. Trains are fully accessible by lifts and escalators. Materials such as steel and concrete have been used throughout.

Sarriko station won the 1998 Brunel Award for Railway Design. It is noticeably different from the rest of the stations in the network: in place of the standard 'fosterito', a vast glazed atrium pours natural light into the entire station, and the long, unbroken escalator ride to the ticket hall from street level gives a dramatic sense of character to the station.

Away from the main structures, the design company Akaba created the seating systems for the Metro, which subsequently won the Spanish National Industrial Design Prize from the Ministry of Science and Technology in November 2000. The principal colours used are of white lettering on a red background for key information and black lettering for secondary details.

Rolling stock

Lines 1 and 2 
Metro Bilbao uses 500, 550 and 600 series trains, built by CAF. The company uses 24 trains of the first series, 13 of the second and 9 of the third. All vehicles are maintained and parked in Sopelana and Ariz.

The first 16 vehicles, which carry the numbers UT 501 to 516, were delivered by CAF and ABB in November 1995. Inside each car 2+2 seats are arranged respectively vis-à-vis in the colors of the Corporate design – red and grey.

The metro, like the commuter railroads in the region, is electrified at  via overhead catenary. Each train has sixteen 180 kilowatt motors; together that yields 2880 kilowatts per train unit. The maximum speed is 80 kilometers per hour. A train can carry 712 people, with 144 seated and 568 standing (based upon six passengers standing per square meter).

The number of trains was increased after a renewed order in 1996, to a total of 24 trains with the numbers UT 517 until 524. For the newly constructed line 2, thirteen new trains were ordered from CAF and Adtranz (now parent company of ABB). These new series UT-550 trains were delivered in October 2001. This series offers improvements in energy efficiency and to the air-conditioning systems. These trains are able to climb the deep line 2 tunnel under the river.

Since 1998 automatic train protection, and automatic train operation are used.  The latter implies that the train drivers must press solely a button, and the remainder of the train operation is done through the computer.  This is to be seen as an initial stage for an entirely computer-controlled system.

Line 3 

The line shares rolling stock with the rest of the Euskotren Trena network. Currently, 900 and 950 series trains are used.

See also 
 Barcelona Metro
 Madrid Metro
 Metrovalencia
 List of metro systems

Notes

References

External links 

 
 

Bilbao metro
Rapid transit in Spain
Metre gauge railways in Spain
1995 establishments in Spain
1500 V DC railway electrification
Underground rapid transit in Spain
Estuary of Bilbao